Hopea bracteata is a tree in the family Dipterocarpaceae. The specific epithet bracteata means "thin metal plate", referring to the bracts (leaf-like structures) of the inflorescence.

Description
It has flying (detached) buttress roots. The bark is smooth. The flowers have deep red petals.

Distribution and habitat
Hopea bracteata is native to Thailand, Peninsular Malaysia, Singapore, Sumatra and Borneo.

References

bracteata
Flora of Thailand
Flora of Malaya
Flora of Sumatra
Flora of Borneo
Plants described in 1887
Taxa named by William Burck